The EasyShare P880 is a bridge digital camera from Kodak introduced on August 2, 2005, as part of Performance series. Its siblings are the P850 and the P712. The P880 possesses the largest optical sensor of all three models, with a size of 1/1.8 inches. Distinguishing features include wide-angle coverage of 24 mm (35 mm equivalent), an on screen histogram display, and manual focus-by-wire. In terms of the Kodak product line and price the Performance series are the most sophisticated EasyShare cameras, just below the considerably more expensive Kodak professional DCS pro SLR digital cameras that were discontinued in May 2005.

References 

 Press release
 Model page
 Accessories page
 Kodak P880 online manual also available as downloadable pdf
Optical sensor size from cnet

Reviews
 Digital Camera Resource Page, Jeff Keller
 Digital Camera Info, Emily Raymond
 The Imaging Resource, Shawn Barnett, 23 November 2005
 Megapixel.NET December 2005 Review
 Steve's Digicam, 12 January 2006
 Digital Photography, Simon Joinson, January 2006
 Popular Photography, Dan Richards, March 2006

Related Information
 P880 wiki
 Camerapedia P880 entry

P880
Kodak EasyShare P880